Capsule Losing Contact is a compilation album and box set by the American slowcore band Duster. It was released by The Numero Group as part of the 200 Line series on March 22, 2019, and compiles the four previous Duster releases, Stratosphere, Contemporary Movement, Transmission, Flux and 1975, as well as numerous singles, demos and unreleased material. The album is named after track 9 of the third disc, "Capsule Losing Contact".

Capsule Losing Contact's total print run was 3,000 copies, though it was initially 2,000. The number of copies printed increased due to high demand from Numero customers. Adam Luksetich, the Numero employee who oversaw the Duster set, told The Ringer that "the idea of a Duster box had been discussed in the office for several years, and that it took some time to bring the members of the group around on the idea."

Release and packaging 
Capsule Losing Contact was released as a 3-CD box set as well as a 4-LP box set on "moon dust" vinyl and standard black. The "moon dust" copies were limited to a print run of 500. An accompanying lyric book contains all of the lyrics from the songs included in Capsule Losing Contact. The LPs themselves are stored in individual tip-on jackets, and are then placed in a hard outer shell box which contains a booklet containing full-color photographs and drawings. The album cover is a photo of Montes Apenninus.

Reception 
Pitchfork named Capsule Losing Contact "best reissue" of the week of March 22, 2019.  Tim Sendra of AllMusic wrote, "Capsule Losing Contact sounds great, looks amazing, and totally justifies the prices people are asking for the original records".

Tracklist 
On CD releases, Transmission, Flux and 1975 are compiled together.

Disc 1: Stratosphere

Disc 2: Contemporary Movement

Disc 3: Transmission, Flux

Disc 4: 1975

References 

Duster (band) albums
2019 compilation albums
The Numero Group compilation albums
Slowcore compilation albums